The Kaduna State House of Assembly popularly known as  Lugard Hall, it houses the Lugard Memorial Council Chamber (Northern Nigeria Council of Chiefs) and The Kaduna State House of Assembly, which is a branch of the Government of Kaduna State, it formerly served as the legislative house of the defunct Northern Nigeria (1954-1967) and the British Colonial government of Nigeria (1914-1954) where all legislative decisions and laws for the governance of the region emanated. [[Taraba State House of Assembly]] Named after the then Governor General of Nigeria Sir Frederick Lugard. It is a unicameral body with 34 members elected into the 34 state constituencies. The  Kaduna state  House of Assembly in the forth republic on 3 June 1999 which led to the formation of the first assembly whole life span democratically ended on 3 June 2003. The second assembly commenced on 6 June 2003 after the national election. The legislature been the second tier of Government in democratic dispensation is traditionally and constitutionally bestowed the responsibility of making laws. The Kaduna state House of Assembly is made up of the honorable speaker, his deputy and the representative of various state  constituencies on a single vote basis. These legislators represent the 23 local government council in the state. The current Speaker of the State Assembly is Rt. Hon Yusuf Ibrahim Zailani from Igabi  local government constituency of Kaduna State.
 Zailani was voted speaker following the resignation of Hon. Aminu Shagali.

The Kaduna state house of Assembly Hon. Yusuf Zailani appointed Ahmad Chokali representing Zaria constituency as the new majority leader of the house as a result of impeachment of Hon. Inuwa Muhammed following a no -Confidence Votes passed on him by members.  Also, Hon. Bashir Gatati emerge as the chief whip of Kaduna state house of Assembly.

References

External links
 Kaduna State House of Assembly

State legislatures of Nigeria
State lower houses in Nigeria
Government of Kaduna State